Frantz Granvorka (born 10 March 1976) is a former French volleyball player, a member of France men's national volleyball team in 1996–2007, a participant of the 2004 Olympic Games, a bronze medalist of the 2002 World Championship, a silver medalist of the 2003 European Championship, 1997 French Champion.

Career
French national team, including Granvorka, achieved bronze medal of the 2002 World Championship. Granvorka received individual award for the Best Server of tournament. In 2004 he took part in 2004 Olympic Games and his national team of France took 9th place.

Sporting achievements

Clubs

CEV Champions League
  2007/2008 - with Volley Piacenza

National championships
 1996/1997  French Cup, with Paris Volley
 1996/1997  French Championship, with Paris Volley
 1998/1999  French Cup, with Asnières Volley
 2003/2004  Greek Cup, with Iraklis Thessaloniki
 2007/2008  Italian Championship, with Volley Piacenza
 2009/2010  Turkish Cup, with Ziraat Bankası Ankara
 2009/2010  Turkish Championship, with Ziraat Bankası Ankara

Individually
 2002 FIVB World Championship - Best Server

References

External links

 
 
 

1976 births
Living people
People from Champigny-sur-Marne
French people of Martiniquais descent
French men's volleyball players
Volleyball players at the 2004 Summer Olympics
Olympic volleyball players of France
Ziraat Bankası volleyball players
Iraklis V.C. players
Expatriate volleyball players in Italy
Expatriate volleyball players in Greece
Expatriate volleyball players in Turkey
Sportspeople from Val-de-Marne